Erman Güraçar (born 24 August 1974) is a Turkish football coach and former player who is the manager of Karşıyaka.

Career
Güraçar last played for Bucaspor in Turkey. He played as a left/right back and fullback.

Güraçar was called up 1 time for the Turkey national football team and 1 time for Turkey B national football team.

He has previously played for Kocaelispor, Samsunspor, Beşiktaş J.K., Trabzonspor, Bursaspor, Gaziantepspor, MKE Ankaragücü and Denizlispor.

Honours

Club
Trabzonspor
Turkish Cup: 2002–03

References

External links
 Profile at TFF.org
 Coach profile at TFF

1974 births
Living people
Turkish footballers
Turkey B international footballers
Beşiktaş J.K. footballers
Trabzonspor footballers
Bursaspor footballers
Kocaelispor footballers
Samsunspor footballers
Gaziantepspor footballers
MKE Ankaragücü footballers
Denizlispor footballers
Süper Lig players
Bucaspor footballers
Association football fullbacks
Turkish football managers
Karşıyaka S.K. managers